Swords Against Darkness IV is an anthology of fantasy stories, edited by Andrew J. Offutt. It was first published in paperback by Zebra Books in September 1979.

Summary
The book collects eleven short stories and novelettes and one essay by various fantasy authors, together with a foreword in two parts and a "special word" by Offutt.

Contents
"Foreword - In Two Parts" (Andrew J. Offutt) 
"Mai-Kulala" (Charles R. Saunders) 
"At the Sign of the Brass Breast" (Jeff P. Swycaffer)
"The Reaping" (Ardath Mayhar) 
"The Ballad of Borrell" (Gordon Linzner) 
"Deux Amours d'une Sorciere" (Tanith Lee) 
"Of PIGS and MEN" (essay) (Poul Anderson) 
"Cryptically Yours" (Brian Lumley) 
"Dedication: A Special Word" (Andrew J. Offutt) 
"The Dark Mother" (Diana L. Paxson) 
"Wooden Crate of Violent Death" (Joey Froehlich) 
"The Fane of the Grey Rose" (Charles de Lint) 
"Sandmagic" (Orson Scott Card) 
"The Edge of the World" (Manly Wade Wellman)

External links
ISFD entry for Swords Against Darkness IV

1979 anthologies
Fantasy anthologies
Zebra Books books